Volleyball events were contested at the 1974 Central American and Caribbean Games in Santo Domingo, Dominican Republic.

References
 

1974 Central American and Caribbean Games
1974
1974 in volleyball
International volleyball competitions hosted by the Dominican Republic